Marsfeld is located in Maxvorstadt, Munich, Bavaria, Germany. It is a former military area and the site of the first railway station of the city.

Buildings and structures in Munich
Maxvorstadt